A bass-baritone is a high-lying bass or low-lying "classical" baritone voice type which shares certain qualities with the true baritone voice. The term arose in the late 19th century to describe the particular type of voice required to sing three Wagnerian roles: the title role in Der fliegende Holländer, Wotan/Der Wanderer in the Ring Cycle and Hans Sachs in Die Meistersinger von Nürnberg. Wagner labelled these roles as Hoher Bass ("high bass")—see fach for more details.

The bass-baritone voice is distinguished by two attributes. First, it must be capable of singing comfortably in a baritonal tessitura. Secondly, however, it needs to have the ripely resonant lower range typically associated with the bass voice. For example, the role of Wotan in Die Walküre covers the range from F2 (the F at the bottom of the bass clef) to F4 (the F above middle C), but only infrequently descends beyond C3 (the C below middle C). Bass-baritones are typically divided into two separate categories: lyric bass-baritone and dramatic bass-baritone.

Bass-baritones should not be confused with their vocal cousin—the so-called Verdi baritone. This type of Italianate baritone voice has a brighter tone colour and sings at a slightly higher tessitura than that possessed by the bass-baritone. In addition to the operas of Giuseppe Verdi, its natural home is to be found in operatic music composed after about 1830 by the likes of Donizetti, Ponchielli, Massenet, Puccini and the verismo composers.

The term bass-baritone is roughly synonymous with the Italian vocal classification basso cantante; for example, in the Verdian repertoire, Philip II in Don Carlos is sung by a true bass, while Ferrando in Il trovatore is often taken by a bass - baritone, though the two roles' ranges are very similar. In Debussy's Pelléas et Mélisande the role of Golaud, created by Hector Dufranne, sits between Pelleas (high baritone) and Arkel (bass). Some of the classical Mozart baritone roles such as Don Giovanni, Figaro and Gugliemo—composed before the term "baritone" gained currency—are occasionally played by a bass-baritone.

Gilbert and Sullivan's Savoy operas usually featured a comic bass-baritone character, created to make use of D'Oyly Carte company member Richard Temple.

In short: the bass-baritone is a voice that has the resonant low notes of the typical bass allied with the ability to sing in a baritonal tessitura. Colloquially, it refers to a voice with a range and tone somewhere between a bass and a baritone.

The bass-baritone's required range can vary tremendously based on the role, with some less demanding than others. Many bass-baritones have ventured into the baritone repertoire, including (among others) Leopold Demuth, Georges Baklanoff, Rudolf Bockelmann, George London, Thomas Stewart, James Morris, and Bryn Terfel.

Repertoire

The following operatic parts are performed by bass-baritones but sometimes by high basses:

 Don Pizarro, Fidelio by Ludwig van Beethoven
 Golaud, Pelléas et Mélisande by Claude Debussy
 Olin Blitch, Susannah by Carlisle Floyd
 Méphistophélès, Faust by Charles Gounod
 Leporello, Don Giovanni by Wolfgang Amadeus Mozart 
 Don Alfonso, Così fan tutte by Wolfgang Amadeus Mozart
 Figaro, The Marriage of Figaro by Wolfgang Amadeus Mozart

Core bass-baritone operatic parts:

 Escamillo, Carmen by Georges Bizet
 Igor, Prince Igor by Alexander Borodin (also sung by 'standard' baritones)
 Porgy, Porgy and Bess by George Gershwin
 The 4 Villains, Les contes d'Hoffmann by Jacques Offenbach
 Scarpia, Tosca by Giacomo Puccini (also sung by 'standard' baritones)
 Dutchman The Flying Dutchman by Richard Wagner
 Hans Sachs Die Meistersinger by Richard Wagner
 Wotan Der Ring des Nibelungen by Richard Wagner
 Amfortas Parsifal by Richard Wagner

 Bass-baritone parts in Gilbert and Sullivan works:

 Trial by Jury: Usher
 The Sorcerer: Sir Marmaduke Pointdextre
 H.M.S. Pinafore: Dick Deadeye
 The Pirates of Penzance: The Pirate King
 Patience: Colonel Calverley
 Iolanthe : Lord Mountararat
 Princess Ida: King Hildebrand
 The Mikado: The Mikado of Japan
 Ruddigore: Sir Roderic Murgatroyd
 The Yeomen of the Guard: Sergeant Meryll
 The Gondoliers: Don Alhambra del Bolero

Other bass-baritone parts:

 Roméo et Juliette by Hector Berlioz
 Symphony No.15 by Rued Langgaard
 Cantabile, symphonic suite by Frederik Magle
 Gurre-Lieder by Arnold Schoenberg

See also
Soprano
Alto
Tenor
Baritone
Bass

References

 
Voice types
Opera terminology
Pitch (music)